World Series of Fighting 11: Gaethje vs. Newell was a mixed martial arts event held on July 5, 2014 in the United States. This event aired live in prime time on NBC.

Background
Rousimar Palhares was set to make his first title defense against former UFC veteran Jon Fitch on this show. On April 30, 2014 it was announced that the bout was canceled due to personal problems with Palhares. 

Fitch was then expected to face debuting Jake Shields. However, Shields was forced out of the bout due to an injury. Fitch was then expected to face Josh Burkman in a rubber match. However, Burkman was forced out of the bout due to an elbow injury. Fitch eventually faced Dennis Hallman at the event

This event featured the first Lightweight title defense for Justin Gaethje as he faced undefeated lightweight Nick Newell.

Matt Hamill was expected to make his debut at this event but was sidelined due to a knee injury.

Brian Cobb was expected to face Luis Palomino at the event, however Cobb was removed from the bout for unknown reasons and was replaced by T.J. O'Brien. The bout between Palomino and O'Brien was later cancelled for unknown reasons.

Both Melvin Guillard and Cody Bollinger missed weight for their respective bouts. Guillard forfeited 15% of his purse to Gesias Cavalcante, while Bollinger forfeited over 20% to Pablo Alfonso.

Results

See also 
 World Series of Fighting
 List of WSOF champions
 List of WSOF events

References

World Series of Fighting events
2014 in mixed martial arts
Events in Daytona Beach, Florida